統一 - Chinese characters for unification may refer to:

Political union (reunification) in general including:-
Chinese unification
Korean reunification

Business
A common contraction for:

 Uni-President Enterprises Corporation
 Uni-President 7-Eleven Lions

Geography
Thống Nhất District- and a number of other districts in Vietnam sharing the same name

See also
 Unionism (disambiguation)
 Unionist (disambiguation)